Plantago eriopoda is a species of plantain known by the common name redwool plantain. It is native to much of western and central North America from Alaska to the southwestern United States to the Great Lakes region, where it can be found in moist and wet habitat types, sometimes in alkaline soils. It is a perennial herb producing a clump of lance-shaped to narrow oval leaves up to 25 centimeters long. The leaves may have slightly toothed edges and often have a coating of woolly red hairs near their bases. The stemlike inflorescences grow erect to a maximum height near half a meter. Atop the peduncle of the inflorescence is a dense cylindrical spike of many tiny flowers. Each flower has a whitish corolla with four lobes each about a millimeter long accompanied by sepals covered with small bracts.

External links
Jepson Manual Treatment
Southwest Colorado Wildflowers

eriopoda
Flora of North America